Jamaica competed in the 2010 Commonwealth Games that were held in Delhi, India, from 3 to 14 October 2010. Jamaica sent a 48-member team for this edition of Commonwealth Games. Big names like Asafa Powell and Usain Bolt withdrew from the games and were not present in the squad.

Medalists

See also
 2010 Commonwealth Games

Nations at the 2010 Commonwealth Games
2010